The 2014 World Rowing Championships were the 44th edition of the World Rowing Championships and were held from 24 to 31 August 2014 at Bosbaan, Amsterdam in the Netherlands, the second occasion on which the event had been held in Amsterdam, or the Netherlands. 

The annual week-long rowing regatta is organised by FISA (the International Rowing Federation and in non-Olympic Games years such as 2014 he regatta is the highlight of the international rowing calendar, where all classes of boats compete. 

The 2014 championships were notable for the number of world best times set on days seven & eight of competition. New Zealand rowers Eric Murray and Hamish Bond achieved a rare double in the coxed and coxless pairs.

Medal summary

Men's events 
 Non-Olympic classes

Women's events 
 Non-Olympic classes

Para-rowing (adaptive) events 
All boat classes (except LTAMix2x) are also Paralympic.

Event codes

Medal table

World records
The championships were notable for the number of world best times set on days seven & eight of competition (30 & 31 August) with fourteen long standing world marks set in addition to a number of world best times beaten then bettered during the regatta. Tail winds and fast water affected the conditions on the Bosbaan but the new marks were allowed to stand by FISA. The records included the sixteen fastest ever times rowed at World Championships, with fourteen of those also being the world's best time. As of 2021 eleven of those marks still stand as the world's best times.

References

External links
 Official website

2014
World
International sports competitions hosted by the Netherlands
World Rowing Championships, 2014
World Rowing Championships
World Rowing Championships
August 2014 sports events in Europe
2010s in Amsterdam